Sambuceto   is a frazione  in the Province of Chieti in the Abruzzo region of Italy. It is an area filled with shops such as Iper coop, Leroy Merlin, Obi  and commercial centers.  The Abruzzo airport is also found here  

Frazioni of the Province of Chieti